André Patry (22 November 1902 – 20 June 1960) was a French astronomer and discoverer of 9 minor planets in the late 1930s.

Patry was orphaned at a young age, and began working as a 17-year-old at the Nice Observatory in southeastern France. He studied asteroids and discovered several himself. The inner main-belt asteroid 1601 Patry was named in his honor.

References

External links 
 Obituary – JO 43 (1960) 156 

1902 births
1960 deaths
Discoverers of asteroids

20th-century French astronomers